Owerri West is a Local Government Area of Imo State, Nigeria. Its headquarters are in the town of Umuguma. Owerri West Local Government is administered under the terms of the Constitution of the Federal Republic of Nigeria. Elections to the office of the Chairman of the local government are held through nominations by registered political parties as stipulated by the constitution of the Federal Republic of Nigeria, under the supervision of Imo State Electoral Commission. 
Owerri West was carved out of the former Owerri Local Government Area in 1996. 
A very large portion of the local government constitute the capital city of Imo State, Nigeria. 
 

The postal code of the area is 460.

Communities
 Umuguma
 Avu
 Okuku
 Oforola
 Obinze
 Nekede 
 Ihiagwa
 Eziobodo
 Okolochi
 Emeabiam
 Irete
 Orogwe
 Amakohia-Ubi
 Ndegwu
 Ohii

Prominent locations in Owerri West include:

 Federal Polytechnic  Nnekede, Owerri (FPNO)
 Federal University of Technology Owerri (FUTO)- located at Ihiagwa and Eziobodo as the two major host communities with Okolochi, Obinze and Emeabiam as the minor host communities.
 Nekede Zoo
 Nekede Divisional Police 
 Federal Secretariat - located at Umuguma along Port Harcourt Road
 State Secretariat
 General Hospital Umuguma
 World Bank Housing Estates Umuguma, Area L, M, N
 Federal Housing Estate Umuguma
 Imo State Housing Estate Umuguma
 Concorde Hotel

References

Local Government Areas in Imo State
Local Government Areas in Igboland
Towns in Imo State
Imo State